The 1988–89 Nationale 1A season was the 68th season of the Nationale 1A, the top level of ice hockey in France. 10 teams participated in the league, and Français Volants won their third league title. Bordeaux Gironde Hockey 2000 was relegated to the Nationale 1B.

First round

Final round

Playoffs

Relegation round

External links
Season on hockeyarchives.info

France
1988–89 in French ice hockey
Ligue Magnus seasons